Langsee is a lake in the Rostock district in Mecklenburg-Vorpommern, Germany. At an elevation of 50.1 m, its surface area is 0.82 km².

Lakes of Mecklenburg-Western Pomerania